Antiochus I Soter (Antíochos Sōtér; "Antiochus the Saviour"; c. 324/32 June 261 BC) was a Greek king of the Seleucid Empire. Antiochus succeeded his father Seleucus I Nicator in 281 BC and reigned during a period of instability which he mostly overcame until his death on 2 June 261 BC. He is the last known ruler to be attributed the ancient Mesopotamian title King of the Universe.

Biography
Antiochus's father was Seleucus I Nicator and his mother was Apama, daughter of Spitamenes, being one of the princesses whom Alexander the Great had given as wives to his generals in 324 BC. The Seleucids fictitiously claimed that Apama was the daughter of Darius III, in order to legitimise themselves as the inheritors of both the Achaemenids and Alexander, and therefore the rightful lords of western and central Asia.

In 294 BC, prior to the death of his father Seleucus I, Antiochus married his stepmother, Stratonice, daughter of Demetrius Poliorcetes. The ancient sources report that his elderly father reportedly instigated the marriage after discovering that his son was in danger of dying of lovesickness. Stratonice bore five children to Antiochus: Seleucus (later executed for rebellion), Laodice, Apama II, Stratonice II and Antiochus II Theos, who succeeded his father as king.

The Ruin of Esagila Chronicle, dated between 302 and 281 BC, mentions that a crown prince, most likely Antiochus, decided to rebuild the ruined Babylonian temple Esagila, and made a sacrifice in preparation. However, while there, he stumbled on the rubble and fell. He then ordered his troops to destroy the last of the remains.

On the assassination of his father in 281 BC, the task of holding together the empire was a formidable one. A revolt in Syria broke out almost immediately. Antiochus was soon compelled to make peace with his father's murderer, Ptolemy Keraunos, apparently abandoning Macedonia and Thrace. In Anatolia he was unable to reduce Bithynia or the Persian dynasties that ruled in Cappadocia.

In 278 BC the Gauls broke into Anatolia, and a victory that Antiochus won over these Gauls by using Indian war elephants (275 BC) is said to have been the origin of his title of Soter (Greek for "saviour").

At the end of 275 BC the question of Coele-Syria, which had been open between the houses of Seleucus and Ptolemy since the partition of 301 BC, led to hostilities (the First Syrian War). It had been continuously in Ptolemaic occupation, but the house of Seleucus maintained its claim. War did not materially change the outlines of the two kingdoms, though frontier cities like Damascus and the coast districts of Asia Minor might change hands.

In 268 BC Antiochus I laid the foundation for the Ezida Temple in Borsippa. His eldest son Seleucus had ruled in the east as viceroy from c. 275 BC until 268/267 BC; Antiochus put his son to death in the latter year on the charge of rebellion. Around 262 BC Antiochus tried to break the growing power of Pergamum by force of arms, but suffered defeat near Sardis and died soon afterwards. He was succeeded in 261 BC by his second son Antiochus II Theos.

Ai-Khanoum

Recent analysis strongly suggests that the city of Ai-Khanoum, located in Takhar Province, northern Afghanistan, at the confluence of the Panj River and the Kokcha River and at the doorstep of the Indian subcontinent, was founded c. 280 BC by Antiochus I.

Relations with India
Antiochus I maintained friendly diplomatic relations with Bindusara, ruler of the Maurya Empire of India. Deimachos of Plateia was the ambassador of Antiochus at the court of Bindusara. The 3rd century Greek writer Athenaeus, in his Deipnosophistae, mentions an incident that he learned from Hegesander's writings: Bindusara requested Antiochus to send him sweet wine, dried figs and a sophist. Antiochus replied that he would send the wine and the figs, but the Greek laws forbade him to sell a sophist.

Antiochus is probably the Greek king mentioned in the Edicts of Ashoka, as one of the recipients of the Indian Emperor Ashoka's Buddhist proselytism:

Ashoka also claims that he encouraged the development of herbal medicine, for men and animals, in the territories of the Hellenic kings:

Alternatively, the Greek king mentioned in the Edict of Ashoka could also be Antiochus's son and successor, Antiochus II Theos, although the proximity of Antiochus I with the East may makes him a better candidate.

Neoclassical art

The love between Antiochus and his stepmother Stratonice was often depicted in Neoclassical art, as in a painting by Jacques-Louis David.

References

Bibliography

External links
 
 Appianus' Syriaka 
 Antiochus I Soter : fact sheet at Livius.org
 Babylonian Chronicles of the Hellenic Period 
 Antiochus I Soter entry in historical sourcebook by Mahlon H. Smith
 Hellenization of the Babylonian Culture?
 Coins of Antiochus I

320s BC births
261 BC deaths
Year of birth uncertain
3rd-century BC Babylonian kings
3rd-century BC Seleucid rulers
Antiochus 01
3rd-century BC rulers
Kings of the Universe
Kings of the Lands